The Marriage of Mademoiselle Beulemans (French: Le mariage de Mademoiselle Beulemans) is a 1927 French silent comedy film directed by Julien Duvivier and starring Andrée Brabant, Jean Dehelly and Gustave Libeau. It is based on the 1910 Belgian play Le Mariage de mademoiselle Beulemans.

Cast
 Andrée Brabant as Suzanne Beulemans  
 Jean Dehelly as Albert Delpierre  
 Gustave Libeau as M. Beulemans  
 Dinah Valence as Mme Beulemans  
 René Lefèvre as Seraphím Meulemeester  
 Suzanne Christy as Anna  
 Mary Anne as Isabelle  
 Marcel Barencey as Meulemeester père  
 René Derigal as Delpierre père  
 Hubert Daix as Mortinax  
 Jane Pierson 
 Jean Diéner 
 Esther Delterre 
 Léon Malavier 
 Maude de la Vault

References

Bibliography 
 Goble, Alan. The Complete Index to Literary Sources in Film. Walter de Gruyter, 1999.

External links 
 

1927 films
French silent feature films
1920s French-language films
Films directed by Julien Duvivier
French films based on plays
French black-and-white films
French comedy films
1927 comedy films
Silent comedy films
1920s French films